Athleta is a genus of sea snails, marine gastropod mollusks in the family Volutidae.

Species
Species within the genus Athleta include:

 Athleta abyssicola (Adams & Reeve, 1848)
 † Athleta affinis (Brocchi, 1814) 
 Athleta boswellae (Rehder, 1969)
 † Athleta delvallei Astibia, Merle & Pacaud, 2018 
 Athleta disparilis (Rehder, 1969)
 Athleta easoni Petuch & Berschauer, 2017
 Athleta epigona (Martens, 1904)
 † Athleta ficulina (Lamarck, 1811) 
 † Athleta gabriellis (Benoist, 1874)
 Athleta gilchristi (G.B. Sowerby III, 1902)
 Athleta glabrata (Kilburn, 1971)
 Athleta insperata Darragh, 1979
 Athleta kilburni (Rehder, 1974)
 † Athleta lata (Marwick, 1926) 
 Athleta lutosa (Koch, 1948)
 † Athleta maculosus Lozouet, 2019 
 Athleta magister (Kilburn, 1980)
 † Athleta marwicki P. A. Maxwell, 2003 
 † Athleta memoirae Lozouet, 2019 
 † Athleta mimica P. A. Maxwell, 2003 
 Athleta mozambicana (Rehder, 1972)
 Athleta nana (Rehder & Weaver, 1974)
 † Athleta necopinata Suter, 1917 
 †Athleta permulticostatus (Telegdi-Roth, 1914)
  † Athleta peyreirensis Lozouet, 2019 
 Athleta pisororum H. Morrison, 2006
  † Athleta rathieri (Hébert, 1849) 
 Athleta rosavittoriae (Rehder, 1981)
 Athleta semirugata (Rehder & Weaver, 1974)
 Athleta pisororum Morrison, 2006
 † Athleta spinosa (Linnaeus, 1758) 
 Athleta studeri (Martens, 1897)
 † Athleta subaffinis (d'Orbigny, 1852) 
 † Athleta subambiguus (d'Orbigny, 1852) 
 † Athleta subelegans (d'Orbigny, 1852) 
 Athleta taikoensis P. A. Maxwell, 2003
 † Athleta telegdyi (Gaál, 1938) 
 † Athleta tournoueri (Peyrot, 1928)

subgenus Athleta Conrad, 1853

subgenus Ternivoluta Martens, 1897

Fossil species

subgenus Athleta Conrad, 1853
 † Athleta fayiumensis Abbass, 1967
 † Athleta strombiformis Deshayes, 1835

subgenus † Neoathleta Bellardi, 1890
 † Athleta barrandii Deshayes, 1865
 † Athleta cithara Lamarck, 1802
 † Athleta geminata Edwards, 1854
 † Athleta labrellus Lamarck, 1802
 † Athleta mutatus Deshayes, 1835

subgenus Volutocorbis Dall, 1890
 † Athleta burtoni Vredenburg, 1923
 † Athleta eugeniae Vredenburg, 1923
 † Athleta lasharii Merle & Pacaud, 2014
 † Athleta wynnei Cox, 1930

Sometimes the following species used to be recognized in the separate genus:
 † Volutocorbis humei Abbass, 1967
 † Volutocorbis sohli Abbass, 1967
 † Volutocorbis crenulifera Bayan, 1870
 † Volutocorbis digitalina Lamarck, 1810
 † Volutocorbis elevata Sowerby, 1840
 † Volutocorbis inornatus Oppenheim, 1906
 † Volutocorbis lima Sowerby, 1823
 † Volutocorbis minutus Perrilliat et al., 2006
 † Volutocorbis pakistanica Eames, 1952
 † Volutocorbis scabricula Linnaeus, 1758

subgenus † Volutopupa Dall, 1890
 † Athleta citharopsis Merle & Pacaud, 2014
 † Athleta intercrenatus Cossmann & Pissarro, 1909

subgenus Volutospina Newton, 1906
 † Athleta ambiguus Solander in Brander, 1766
 † Athleta athleta Solander in Brander, 1877
 † Athleta dentata Sowerby, 1839
 † Athleta depauperatus Sowerby, 1823
 † Athleta jacobsi Vredenburg, 1921
 † Athleta luctator Sowerby, 1823
 † Athleta mekranica Vredenburg, 1925
 † Athleta nodosa Sowerby, 1829
 † Athleta noetlingi Cossmann & Pissarro, 1909
 † Athleta sindiensis Vredenburg, 1925
 † Athleta spinosa Linnaeus, 1758
 † Athleta subambigua d'Orbigny, 1852
 † Athleta suspensus Solander in Brander, 1766
 † Volutospina conicoturrita Newton, 1922
 † Volutospina kohatica Eames, 1952
 † Volutospina multispinosa Newton, 1922

subgenus ?
 † Athleta clayi
 † Athleta daviesi Cox, 1930
 † Athleta ficulina Lamarck, 1811
 † Athleta haleanus
 † Athleta lisbonensis
 † Athleta lisbonensis forma crockettensis Plummer, 1933
 † Athleta lugardi Newton, 1922
 † Athleta petrosa Conrad, 1833
 † Athleta pygmaea Bellardi, 1890
 † Athleta rarispina Lamarck, 1811
 † Athleta sayanus Conrad, 1833
 † Athleta symmetricus Conrad, 1854
 † Athleta wynnei Cox, 1930

References

 Merle & Pacaud & Marivaux,  Volutidae (Mollusca: Gastropoda) of the Lakhra Formation (Earliest Eocene, Sindh, Pakistan): systematics, biostratigraphy and paleobiogeography; Zootaxa, 3826 (1) : 101-138, fig. 1-12. , 2014

External links

Volutidae